Vaai Kolone (11 November 1911 – 20 April 2001) was the fourth prime minister of Samoa and a founder of the Human Rights Protection Party (HRPP) in Samoa. He served as Prime Minister twice, first between 13 April and 18 September 1982, and then from 30 December 1985 until 8 April 1988.

Biography 

He was from Vaisala village on Savai'i island in the political district of Vaisigano.

Kolone was first elected to parliament, the Legislative Assembly of Samoa, in 1967 representing the electorate of Vaisigano No. 1. In 1979, together with Tofilau Eti Alesana he founded the Human Rights Protection Party to oppose the government of Tupuola Efi.  The HRPP won 24 seats in the 1982 election, and Kolone was appointed Prime Minister. However, an election petition stripped him of his seat shortly afterwards due to bribery charges and he was forced to resign. The party would go on to rule Samoa until 2021. Tupuola Efi was appointed Prime Minister and served until Kolone regained his seat in the subsequent by-election. In the meantime Tofilau Eti Alesana had been elected leader of the HRPP and served as Prime Minister for the rest of the parliamentary term.

Kolone resigned from the HRPP after failing to regain the party leadership after the 1985 election.  However, in late 1985 11 HRPP Members of Parliament defected to form a coalition government with the then-opposition Christian Democratic Party.  Kolone was elected Prime Minister on 30 December, with Efi as his deputy.  The coalition was later formalised as the Samoan National Development Party.  He subsequently led the SNDP in the 1991 election, gaining 14 seats.

His sons Va'ai Papu Vailupe and Asiata Sale'imoa Va'ai also became members of Parliament.

References

External links
 Profile at rulers.org

Members of the Legislative Assembly of Samoa
Prime Ministers of Samoa
Foreign ministers of Samoa
People from Vaisigano
Samoan chiefs
1911 births
2001 deaths
Human Rights Protection Party politicians
Samoan National Development Party politicians
20th-century Samoan politicians